The year 1766 in architecture involved some significant events.

Buildings and structures

Buildings

 April 17 – James Craig's plan for the New Town, Edinburgh, Scotland, wins the prize offered by the city council in January.
 October 28 – Coldstream Bridge across the River Tweed on the England/Scotland border, designed by John Smeaton, is opened to traffic.
 Paxton House, Berwickshire, Scotland, is completed.
 Strawberry Hill House, London, designed by Horace Walpole, is completed in the Gothick style.
 Pazo de Raxoi in Santiago de Compostela, Spain, is completed.
 Rebuilding of Potocki Palace, Warsaw, to designs by Jakub Fontana, is completed.
 Shardeloes (country house) in Buckinghamshire, England, designed by Stiff Leadbetter, is completed.
 New main residence at Skjoldenæsholm Castle in Denmark, possibly designed by Philip de Lange, is built.
 Theatre Royal, Bristol, England, built by Thomas Paty to designs by James Saunders, is opened.
 New Drottningholm Palace Theatre in Stockholm, designed by Carl Fredrik Adelcrantz, is completed as an opera house.
 St. Paul's Chapel on Broadway (Manhattan) in New York City, designed by Thomas McBean, is completed.
 St Nikolaus church at Brohl in the Rhineland, designed by J. A. Neurohr, is built.
 St Markus church at Pünderich in the Rhineland, designed by Paul Stähling, is built.
 Stone Hermitage and Rozhdestvensky Bridges in Saint Petersburg are completed.

Publications
 John Gwynn – London and Westminster Improved

Births
 August 3 – Jeffry Wyatville, English architect (died 1840)

Deaths
 January 19 – Giovanni Niccolò Servandoni, French architect and painter (born 1695)
 May 6 – Johann Michael Fischer, German architect (born 1692)
 July 14 – František Maxmilián Kaňka, Czech architect (born 1674)
 August 18 – Stiff Leadbetter, English architect (born c.1705)
 November 16 – Dominikus Zimmermann, German rococo architect (born 1685)
 December 20 – Giorgio Massari, Venetian baroque architect (born 1687)
 Isaac Ware, English architect (born 1704)

References

Architecture
Years in architecture
18th-century architecture